Jordan Milbrath (born August 1, 1991) is an American professional baseball pitcher who is a free agent.

Career
Milbrath graduated from Springfield High School in Springfield, Minnesota. He attended Augustana University, where he played college baseball for the Augustana Vikings, and he played collegiate summer baseball for the Rochester Honkers of the Northwoods League.

Cleveland Indians
The Cleveland Indians selected Milbrath in the 35th round, with the 1,041st selection, of the 2013 MLB draft. He signed and made his professional debut that year with the Rookie-league AZL Indians where he was 1-1 with a 4.87 ERA in 20.1 relief innings pitched. He also pitched in one game for the Lake County Captains of the Class A Midwest League at the end of the season.

Milbrath pitched for Lake County in both 2014, where he was 3-12 with a 3.95 ERA in 26 games (23 starts), and in 2015, where he compiled a 7-11 record and a 4.54 ERA in 27 games (26 starts). He also pitched in the Arizona Fall League.

He spent the 2016 season with the Lynchburg Hillcats of the Class A-Advanced Carolina League where he pitched to a 3-5 record with a 5.43 ERA in 41 relief appearances. He also pitched one game with the Akron RubberDucks of the Class AA Eastern League at the end of the season. He began the 2017 season with Lynchburg, where he was taught to pitch sidearm, before receiving a midseason promotion to Akron. He made 15 relief appearances for both teams. Pitching sidearm, Milbrath's earned run average decreased from 5.43 in 2016 to 3.02 in 2017, and he also decreased his walks per nine innings pitched from 5.3 to 3.3.

The Pittsburgh Pirates selected Milbrath from the Indians' organization in the 2017 Rule 5 draft. He competed for a spot on Pittsburgh's 2018 Opening Day 25-man roster, but was waived and returned to Cleveland before the start of the regular season. He began the season with Akron.

Miami Marlins
On February 4, 2019, Milbrath was traded to the Miami Marlins in exchange for Nick Wittgren. Milbrath split the season between the Triple-A New Orleans Baby Cakes and the Double-A Jacksonville Jumbo Shrimp, pitching to a 2-3 record and 3.84 ERA with 72 strikeouts in 65.2 innings pitched across 36 cumulative appearances. He became a free agent following the 2019 season.

Arizona Diamondbacks
On January 20, 2020, Milbrath signed a minor league deal with the Arizona Diamondbacks organization. He did not play in a game in 2020 due to the cancellation of the minor league season because of the COVID-19 pandemic. On May 22, Milbrath was released.

Minnesota Twins
On May 14, 2021, Milbrath signed a minor league contract with the Minnesota Twins. He appeared in 6 games for the Double-A Wichita Wind Surge, but struggled to a 10.00 ERA with 12 strikeouts in 9.0 innings pitched. He was released by the organization on July 14.

Personal life
Milbrath worked a temp job for NFL Films at Super Bowl LII.

See also
Rule 5 draft results

References

External links

Living people
1991 births
People from Springfield, Minnesota
Baseball players from Minnesota
Baseball pitchers
Augustana (South Dakota) Vikings baseball players
Arizona League Indians players
Lake County Captains players
Lynchburg Hillcats players
Akron RubberDucks players
Jacksonville Jumbo Shrimp players
New Orleans Baby Cakes players
Rochester Honkers players